Bedrettin is a Turkish given name derived from the Arabic name Badr al-Din. Notable people with the name include:

 Bedrettin Dalan (born 1941), Turkish engineer and politician
 Bedrettin Tuncel (1910–1980), Turkish academic and politician
 Bedrettin Yıldızeli (born 1970), Turkish physician

Turkish masculine given names